The Optimist is a British television comedy series starring Enn Reitel and produced by Robert Sidaway. Each episode tells a separate comic adventure in the life of an everyday man who, whether it turns out a success or a failure, always remains optimistic. The stories made a feature of fantasy and dream sequences.

Citing the influences of Jacques Tati, Buster Keaton and Charlie Chaplin, as well as the character of Walter Mitty, the series was designed as a silent comedy, with original music and enhanced sound effects. Shooting on 16mm, it was made on location in Cabo San Lucas, Los Angeles and London. A total of thirteen episodes were produced.

The series debuted on 14 April 1983 and the final episode was broadcast on 5 January 1985.

Series

Series 1

After producer Robert Sidaway raised the finance independently, the pilot Sea Dreams was filmed on location in Cabo San Lucas, Mexico, during summer 1981 with post-production taking place in Los Angeles and London.

After a private screening in Wardour Street, Cecil Korer, Programme Purchaser and Commissioning Editor for Light Entertainment at Channel 4, subsequently commissioned a further six episodes.

Each half-hour episode starred Enn Reitel in the title role of The Optimist with the remainder of the cast specific to the requirements of the separate stories. In addition, every episode featured a different British actress as part of the romantic interest.

Filming took place in various locations in Los Angeles during summer 1982 under the direction of Peter Ellis. Director of photography was Peter Appleton, the art director was Mike Porter and the costume designer was Jo Korer.

Composer David Spear wrote and recorded the main theme and extensive score in Los Angeles while the remainder of post-production was completed in London. The editor was John Daniels.

Announced in the press and previewed on Channel 4's opening night (2 November 1982), series one was broadcast on Channel 4 at 8 pm on consecutive Thursdays between 14 April and 26 May 1983.

Series 2

Further to the broadcast of series 1, Channel 4 commissioned a second series of six new episodes. The stories were shot on location in London during the summer of 1984 under the direction of Robert Fuest. The new Director of Photography was Francis de Groote, who worked as Assistant Cameraman on the first series, while Mike Porter and Jo Korer repeated their roles as Art Director and Costume Designer respectively.

Utilizing the original main theme, John Cameron joined the production to write the new music scores.

Series 2 was broadcast on Channel 4 at 8 pm on consecutive nights between 31 December 1984 and 5 January 1985.

Episodes

Series 1 (1983)

Series 2 (1984-1985)

Gallery

References

External links

The Optimist official website

British comedy television shows
1983 British television series debuts
1985 British television series endings
Channel 4 original programming